Michael Thomas Moran (born 1962) is a United States Navy vice admiral who most recently served as Principal Military Deputy to the Assistant Secretary of the Navy (Research, Development and Acquisition) from October 12, 2018 to August 4, 2021. He previously served as the Program Executive Officer for Tactical Aircraft Programs. Raised in Walden, New York, Moran is a 1984 graduate of the United States Naval Academy with a B.S. degree in engineering. He was designated a naval flight officer in 1986 and later received an M.S. degree in human resources management from Troy State University.

Awards and decorations

References

1962 births
Living people
Place of birth missing (living people)
United States Naval Academy alumni
United States Naval Flight Officers
Troy University alumni
Recipients of the Defense Superior Service Medal
Recipients of the Legion of Merit
United States Navy admirals